The Italian Campaign of 1813-1814 was the series of military operations fought during the War of the Sixth Coalition, mainly in northern Italy between the French Empire and the Coalition led by Austrians and British. It represented the last time of the so-called "French period", precisely from the campaign of 1796-1797, in which a French and an Austrian army confronted each other for control of the Italian peninsula. The Austro-Neapolitan War of 1815 was essentially a clash between only Italians and Austrians.

After the disastrous Russian campaign, the Army of the Kingdom of Italy was severely weakened. It distinguished itself once again during the German campaign of 1813, but when the Austrian Empire entered the war on 12 August, it was largely recalled south to face the Coalition invasion. The Franco-Italian army was commanded by the viceroy of Italy Eugène de Beauharnais, stepson of Napoleon Bonaparte, while the allied army, in this theatre of operations, was placed under the command of the Austrian field marshal Heinrich Johann Bellegarde and the British general William Bentinck. Alongside the Austrians and the British there were again the Kingdom of Sicily of Ferdinand IV of Bourbon and the Kingdom of Sardinia of Victor Emmanuel I.

Initially the Franco-Italians managed to slow down the advance of the Coalition in the Illyrian Provinces, thanks above all to the Battle of Feistritz, but already on 5 October they had to fall back towards the Isonzo, the eastern border of the Kingdom of Italy, and in the middle of month began the invasion of the kingdom. The already disproportion of forces was aggravated by the defection of the Kingdom of Bavaria of Maximilian I Joseph of Bavaria first and, above all, of the Kingdom of Naples  of  Joachim Murat thereafter. Murat had chosen to change sides not only to maintain his dominion, but also to expand it, trying in this way to carry out his project to unify much of Italy under his person.

However, the troops of Beauharnais continued to fight valiantly in the Po Valley and obtained tactical victories against the Austrians in the battles of Caldiero and Mincio; however, the spring of 1814 was marked by the defeats in the battles of San Maurizio and the Taro and by the progressive advance of the Coalition in the Italian territory. Meanwhile, Napoleon was defeated in the Campaign in north-east France (1814) and consequently abdicated as Emperor of the French and King of Italy in April. From that moment the Napoleonic authority in the peninsula actually ceased to exist. On April 23, Eugène de Beauharnais was forced to sign the Convention of Mantua, and then self-exiled to Bavaria. By the end of the month the remaining Italian garrisons had to surrender.

The fall of the Kingdom of Italy was a particularly traumatic event for Italian patriots and intellectuals, including Ugo Foscolo, Giovanni Berchet and Alessandro Manzoni, who saw the dream of a united Italy shattered. Manzoni in particular wrote a song entitled " April 1814 " in which he wished to maintain the independence of the kingdom, which was not done at the behest of the Congress of Vienna. The memory of a free and liberal Italian state under Napoleon will give the necessary impetus to the patriots during the Risorgimento, to continue fighting for unification.

Historical context 
After the battle of Lützen, Napoleon Bonaparte, who held the title of King of Italy, sent his stepson, Viceroy Eugène de Beauharnais, to the country to mobilize the forces of the kingdom against the Coalition. Almost all the regular troops of the Kingdom of Italy had died in Russia and therefore Beauharnais had to rebuild the army. He successfully exploited the temporary neutrality of the Austrian Empire and by July 1813 had collected 45,000 infantry, 1,500 cavalry and 130 guns. After Austria entered the war in August 1813, its former provinces in Croatia, conquered by Napoleon and annexed to his empire, began to rebel against French rule.

Campaign of the Illyrian Provinces
Beauharnais deployed soldiers along the road from Tarvisio to Ljubljana to face the Austrians of General Johann von Hiller, and between the end of August and the beginning of September he ordered an attack on the side of Villach. They resulted in short-term successes: in those days Fiume was evacuated by General Pierre Dominique Garnier and occupied by Field Marshal Laval Nugent von Westmeath, while the whole of Istria fell into the hands of the Austrians. The viceroy, threatened on his right, sent General Domenico Pino against Nugent, who defeated the enemy at Jeltschaneand in Lipa and on 15 September he had Rijeka occupied by Gillot Rougier 's brigade. However, Beauharnais, not satisfied, replaced Pino with general Giuseppe Federico Palombini, who, however, was unable to prevent the Austrians from reoccupying Fiume, Lipa and Adelsberg and putting the blockade on Trieste.

At that point Dalmatia was lost to the French Empire. The Croatian troops deserted en masse and the uprisings of the populations became unsustainable. On 31 October General Franjo Tomašić occupied Tenin, on 1 November Colonel Donese took Seico , on 6 December General Roise, closed in Zadar by the British and Tomasich, capitulated to honourable conditions and at the same time Hvar, Split, Clissa and Trogir. The last to capitulate were Cattaro and Ragusa. Cattaro, defended by the general Jean-Joseph Gauthier surrendered on 4 January 1814 , while Ragusa, defended by General Joseph Hélie Désiré Perruquet de Montrichard, surrendered on 29 January.

Operations in Italy
In October 1813 Beauharnais withdrew to the right of the Isonzo and General Paul Grenier left Tarvisio to concentrate his forces on the Tagliamento, between Venzone and Gemona. On 15 October the Austrian army of 50,000 men under the command of Lieutenant Marshal Paul von Radivojevich , favoured by the entry into the war of the Kingdom of Bavaria, entered the territory of the Kingdom of Italy in two columns from the east between the Alps and the Adriatic coast. From the north they invaded South Tyrol and reached Trento, forcing General Alessandro de Rege of Gifflenga to retire to Volano and Rovereto. Three days later the general Christoph Ludwig von Eckhardt , for Cortina d'Ampezzo and Pieve di Cadore, arrived in Longarone, on the 22nd he occupied Feltre and on the 23rd, for Primolano and Cismon, he arrived in Bassano del Grappa.

The fighting was mainly reduced to manoeuvres. The troops of Beauharnais were driven out of their positions by bypassing, until in November 1813 they stopped along the line of the river Adige. In the same month, King Maximilian I Joseph of Bavaria urged his son-in-law Eugène to renounce Napoleon's lost cause, but Beauharnais refused.

On 29 October Colonel Rabié, after sixteen days of resistance, ceded the castle of San Giusto di Trieste to Nugent. The general, in agreement with the British, landed at Goro, Emilia–Romagna on 15 November and in four days conquered Gorino, Po di Gnocca, Comacchio, Magnavacca, Ferrara and Rovigo, and connected with Hiller, who was blocking Venice. General Hiller was defeated on 15 November at Caldiero.

The French generals Couchy and Marcoquet tried to reconquer the Polesine, but failed and could not even prevent Nugent from advancing by occupying Badia Polesine (11 December). General Pino, on the other hand, succeeded, on 26 November, in reoccupying Ferrara. At the same time the Anglo-Sicilians made landings on the coasts of Tuscany, hoping to revive the populations. On 9 December the British fleet of Admiral Josias Rowley landed near Viareggio 1 500 Sicilian soldiers led by Colonel Carlo Catinelli, who took possession of the fort and the area, sent a hundred men to La Spezia and on the 11th they occupied Lucca, which, however, evacuated after twenty-four hours. A few days later the same body landed in Calambrone and tried to take Livorno; not being the successful enterprise, he resumed the sea on the 15th and returned to Sicily.

Meanwhile, from the Adige line, Beauharnais was monitoring the critical situation. More than the Austrians, he was concerned about the attitude of the King of Naples, Joachim Murat, returning from the Kingdom of Saxony. After Napoleon's defeat in the Battle of Leipzig, the Marshal had left the Grande Armée. Murat met the viceroy in Guastalla for a consultation, during which he induced him to occupy and then divide Italy with him, detach it from France, proclaim its independence and then defend it together from the Austrians.

Murat had long advocated the idea of unifying Italy with him as sovereign, and now that his brother-in-law Napoleon was losing the war, he had returned to the idea of ​​getting out of the vassalage in which Bonaparte held him, making use of the help of the Coalition and of the sentiments of independence awakened in the Italian population. Arriving in Naples on 4 November, to ingratiate himself with the British, he abolished the laws of the Continental System, reopened, spurred on by his wife Carolina, Napoleon's sister, negotiations with the secretary of the Austrian legation and with General Lord William Bentinck and sent two divisions, one under the command of General Michele Carrascosa, the other under General Angelo d'Ambrosio, in Rome and Ancona, writing to Napoleon that those troops were used to defend northern Italy, and reassuring Austria by telling her that those soldiers were not advancing towards the Po with hostile intentions to the Austrians, who were getting there.

In the first days of December Murat's Neapolitan army occupied Rome and Ancona, without the Franco-Italians having a clear idea of what its intent was. General Sextius Alexandre François de Miollis, who distrusted Murat, closed himself in Castel Sant'Angelo. In Ancona, General Gabriel Barbou des Courières closed himself up in the citadel. On December 19 the Neapolitan general Carlo Filangieri arrived in Florence and from there he continued to Bologna where he arrived on the 28th. In the last days of the month, the towns of  Rimini, Cesena, Pesaro and Fano were occupied by the Neapolitans who made contact with the Austrians, already masters of Ravenna, Cervia, Lugo and Forlì and began to attempt approaches with General Pino.

Finally, on 11 January 1814, Murat signed an offensive and defensive alliance with Austria in Naples: this guaranteed his continued possession of the kingdom  and, with a secret article, promised him an increase in territory in the Papal States; moreover it provided for a renunciation by Ferdinand IV of the mainland domains. In exchange Murat renounced claims on Sicily. Regarding military operations, the general pledged to support the Coalition with an army of 30,000 men. On 21 January 1814, the Kingdom of Naples changed sides, pitching its 30,000 soldiers against the former ally Beauharnais.

However Murat avoided engaging in active hostilities against the Franco-Italian troops, as a result of which the troops of Beauharnais succeeded in curbing the advance of the Austrians and the British landing in the Po area. Under the strong pressure of his new allies, Murat made slow attacks with no great results.

With the war now clearly in favour of the Coalition, and with the betrayal of his brother-in-law, Napoleon wrote to his stepson Eugène to abandon Italy and retreat with his troops towards the Western Alps, but Beauharnais refused, wanting to confront the Austro-Neapolitan army. At the same time Bonaparte freed Pope Pius VII, to prevent the Coalition from doing so.

Meanwhile, Field Marshal Heinrich Johann Bellegarde had taken command of the Austrian army on 15 December 1813 in Vicenza and, in January, ordered his troops to carry out a new offensive along the Adige. While Nugent advancing from Ferrara occupied all of Romagna, Bellegarde showed his diplomatic skills and managed to convince Murat to deploy 20,000 of his men in Emilia-Romagna against Beauharnais. Bellegarde had designated Count Nugent's corps (about 9,000 men, 800 horsemen and 21 artillery pieces) for operations on the right bank of the Po in order to threaten the right flank of the viceroy of Italy on the Mincio.

Knowing that the enemy was concentrating his troops between Villafranca di Verona and Roverbella, Beauharnais decided to give him battle on 8 February and made arrangements for the movements of his army. But on the very day that he had decided to attack, Marshal Bellegarde, believing that the viceroy had already withdrawn towards Alessandria, leaving very few troops on the Mincio, had ordered generals Radivojevich and Franz von Merville to cross the river at Borghetto di Borbera and to Bozzolo, and to generals Anton Mayer von Heldenfeld and Annibale Sommariva to face Mantua and Peschiera del Garda. Thus it was that the simultaneous offensive movements of the two armies gave rise to a battle with great bloodshed. The viceroy initially managed to keep the field against the Austrians, but in the long run his position was lost.

On 11 February Murat occupied the citadel of Ancona, abandoned by the French. The right wing of the Austrians faced Beauharnais near Parma in early March. In agreement with Murat, Nugent decided on March 6 to attack the enemy in Reggio Emilia. On 7 March the Austrians marched under the command of Major General Anton Gundacker von Starhemberg and the Neapolitan division of General Carrascosa to Reggio, where the Italian general Filippo Severoli had taken refuge with 7,000 men near the San Maurizio district. On 10 March the Austrians had reached the Taro, occupied Fornovo and were approaching Piacenza. After receiving the news of Napoleon's renunciation of the throne, Eugène signed an agreement with the Austrian general, Count Karl Ludwig von Ficquelmont, following which on 16 April he renounced his arms, ceded Milan and ceded overall command of the Kingdome of Italy's troops to Bellegarde. At that juncture Eugène de Beauharnais wanted to be crowned (something the Coalition did not oppose), but the Italian Senato consulente refused.

Venice was occupied by the Austrians on 20 April while being made aware of the capture of Genoa by the Anglo-Sicilians on the same day. Also on 20 April a rebellion against the viceroy broke out in Milan which led to the lynching of the Minister of Finance Giuseppe Prina.

Consequently, on 23 April Beauharnais signed the Convention of Mantua, with which the Austrians managed to occupy all of northern Italy, and he withdrew to Bavaria under the patronage of King Maximilian I Joseph.

The Austrians entered Milan on 28 April and King Vittorio Emanuele I of Savoy entered Turin on 20 May. On 27 April the French garrisons surrendered in Piacenza and on 28 April also the fortress of Mantua.

References

Bibliography

Related items 
 Fall of the Kingdom of Italy
 Battle of Feistritz
 Battle of Caldiero (1813)
 Battle of the Mincio River (1814)
 Siege of Genoa (1814)
 :it:Cattura di La Spezia
 :it:Assedio di Trieste

External links 

Napoleonic Wars
1810s in Europe
Conflicts in 1813
Conflicts in 1814
Coalition Wars